Imerio Cima (born 29 October 1997 in Brescia) is an Italian cyclist, who currently rides for UCI ProTeam . His older brother Damiano Cima is also a cyclist, and is also part of the  squad.

Major results

2017
 1st Circuito del Porto
 4th ZLM Tour
 7th Road race, UEC European Under-23 Road Championships
2018
 9th Overall Tour of Taihu Lake
1st  Young rider classification
2019
 3rd Coppa Bernocchi
 6th Overall Tour of Taihu Lake
1st  Young rider classification
 7th Grand Prix de Fourmies
2020
 7th Paris–Chauny
 10th Giro della Toscana

References

External links

1997 births
Living people
Italian male cyclists
Cyclists from Brescia